Indiana Bicentennial Torch Relay was an Olympic-style torch relay to mark the 200th anniversary of the state of Indiana. The relay spanned 3,200 miles over all 92 counties in the state. It started on September 9, 2016 in Corydon, IN, the state’s first capital, and ended October 15, 2016 at the Statehouse Grounds in Indianapolis. The relay path included 17 state parks, 260 cities, 9 rivers and lakes, and 22 college campuses.

Torch
The torch for the relay has been designed and built by a group of faculty, staff and students at Purdue University. The torch design is inspired by the flag of Indiana and contains two circles of stars. The larger circle is around the burner and similar to that in the flag contains 13 stars for the Thirteen Colonies. The smaller circle with 5 stars around the handle is for states that joined by 1812 before Indiana became the 19th state in 1816.

Torchbearers
Over 2,000 torchbearers were selected to represent their counties in the torch relay. 
Mitch Daniels, president of Purdue University and the former governor of Indiana
 Bob and Ellie Haan, co-founders of Haan Mansion Museum of Indiana Art
 John I. Jenkins, president of University of Notre Dame
  Tuck Langland, sculptor
 Pamela Mow, president of the Indiana Gold Star Mothers 
 Betty Nelson, dean of students emerita at Purdue University
 Bob Shannon, a host at WSCH radio station 
 Sharon Versyp, basketball player and head coach of Purdue University women's basketball team
David Wolf (astronaut)

References

External links
 Indiana Bicentennial Celebration 2016
 Indiana Bicentennial Torch Introduction video

Torch relays